

A through K

L

M

N

O

P

Q

R

S

T

U

V

W

X

Y

Z